¡Asu mare! Los amigos is a 2023 Peruvian comedy film directed by Carlos Alcántara (in his directorial debut) and written by Rasec Barragán, Renato Fernandez and Marco Rubina. It is a spin-off film from the film trilogy !Asu mare!, which also serves as a sequel to the final film. It stars Andrés Salas, Franco Cabrera, Emilram Cossio and Miguel Vergara. It premiered on February 9, 2023 in Peruvian theaters.

Synopsis 
Cachin's friends are back. After overcoming many challenges, an inheritance will put them to the test, facing funny situations and dark characters that will try to boycott one of their greatest dreams.

Cast 
The actors participating in this film are:

 Andrés Salas as “El Culi”
 Franco Cabrera as "Lechuga"
 Emilram Cossio as “Poroto”
 Miguel Vergara as  "El Chato"

Production 
After the premiere of ¡Asu mare! 3, Carlos Alcantara, the protagonist of the trilogy, stated that there were no plans for a fourth installment. However, at the end of 2021, production of a fourth installment focused on Cachin's friends was confirmed with the preliminary title of ¡Asu mare! 4 and Chesu mare and a release planned sometime in 2022.

On March 3, 2022, Tondero Productions announced that Carlos Alcantara would direct the new film and that it would be released at the end of 2022. In June 2022, actor Ricardo Mendoza declared that he would not star in ¡Asu mare! 4 after a controversy surrounding his comedy web program Hablando huevadas in which he made offensive jokes.

Filming 
Principal photography began on September 12, 2022, and ended on October 9 of the same year.

Promotion 
On November 8, 2022, Tondero released the teaser trailer for ¡Asu mare! 4, which announced the film's final name, ¡Asu mare! Los amigos. On December 12, 2022, a final trailer was released, revealing that the film will be released on February 9, 2023.

Reception 
On its first day, the film was seen by 55,000 viewers, making it the most successful Peruvian premiere since the start of the COVID-19 pandemic. It drew nearly 205,000 viewers by the end of its opening weekend.

References 

2023 films
2023 comedy films
Peruvian comedy films
Tondero Producciones films
2020s Spanish-language films
2020s Peruvian films
Films set in Peru
Films shot in Peru
Films set in restaurants
Films about friendship
2023 directorial debut films

Film spin-offs
Peruvian sequel films